Pahiram ng Sandali (International title: Chasing Moments / ) is a Philippine television drama series broadcast by GMA Network. Directed by Maryo J. de los Reyes, it stars Dingdong Dantes and Lorna Tolentino. It premiered on November 26, 2012 on the network's Telebabad line up replacing Coffee Prince. The series concluded on March 15, 2013 with a total of 80 episodes. It was replaced by Mundo Mo'y Akin in its timeslot.

Cast and characters

Lead cast
 Lorna Tolentino as Janice Alvaro-Reyes
A media executive and the editor-in-chief of "Pinoy Reporter"—one of the popular tabloids in the country. She is hurt by her husband's lack of interest and is flattered by a young man's sincere interest and affection.
 Dingdong Dantes as Alex Santiago
A photo journalist in Pinoy Reporter, a tabloid owns and runs by his biological father, Larry Gomez. Alex is man driven by his desire to care for his mother and to prove his worth to his father. He falls in love with Janice Alvaro, an older woman, whose love realigns his goals in life.

Supporting cast
 Christopher de Leon as Philip Reyes
Janice's husband; a famous lawyer [though he owed everything he has to his wife]. His ego drives him to commits the greatest mistakes of his life and indulges an illicit affair with a much younger woman, Baby Umali, which gains the wrath of his only daughter, Cindy.
 Max Collins as Cindy Reyes
The only daughter of Philip and Janice Reyes. Cindy is an independent and adventurous woman who falls for Alex Santiago and later finds herself entangled in a love triangle with her mom.
 Alessandra De Rossi as Baby Umali
A cunning and ambitious lady, moonlighting as a lounge singer in a hotel. Here she meets Philip Reyes, which she finds as a "good catch". She became his mistress and vows to do everything to keep him in her life.
 Mark Gil as Larry Gomez
Gomez runs "The Philippine Examiner", considered as the most respected and influential news paper in the country and the sister-newspaper of "Pinoy Reporter". He is Alex Santiago's biological father who abandoned him several years ago.
 Sandy Andolong as Thea Santiago
Alex and Franz's loving and protective mother. She spends her life as a destitute mother whose only dream is to raise her children the best way she can.
 Kristofer Martin as Franz dela Cruz
Alex Santiago's half-brother; Thea's son with Berting dela Cruz. Grew up as a rebellious son and envies his older brother because of the love and attention that Thea’s been exerting to him.
 Isabel Rivas as Diana Gomez
The spouse of Larry and mother to Andrew. She is also the woman who was instrumental in catapulting Larry to his present stature [her family owned a huge publishing house which is now runs by Larry]. Diana loves her husband to a passion and would go to any length just to keep him.
 Neil Ryan Sese as Andrew Gomez
The only son and heir of Larry and Diana Gomez. As arrogant as his father, Andrew grew happy-go-lucky and enjoys his family's wealth without the responsibilities. He falls in love with his childhood sweetheart, Cindy and will be entangled in a love triangle with his half-brother, Alex Santiago.
 Roy Alvarez as Romer Alcaraz
A veteran hard news reporter and columnist of the tabloid, "Pinoy Reporter". He meets Alex Santiago and become his protégé. A man of full of values, he teaches Alex to "value and appreciate every single moment because everything is just borrowed".
 Luz Valdez as Trining Alvaro
Janice Alvaro's doting spinster aunt-personal assistant-best friend-confidante-conscience and defender rolled into one.
 Julio Diaz as Berting dela Cruz
Thea Santiago's live in partner and father of Franz. An unprincipled man who loves to drink and gamble rather than to work for his family.

Guest cast
 Caridad Sanchez as Salve Umali
Baby's supportive and equally tough grandmother. Salve is ready to do whatever it takes just to protect her granddaughter from further pains and disappointments.
 Neri Naig as Regina
Pinoy Reporter’s novelist-turned-police crime reporter. Her nerdy looks and being "loveless forever" become points of humor within the office. Regina eventually developed a genuine fondness for Alex Santiago, which causes friction between her and Cindy Reyes.
 Marissa Sanchez as Sonia
The psychic and horoscope writer of Pinoy Reporter. She is also the leader of the "gossip group" in the office, wherein she knows everything, including her bosses' personal issues and flaws. Sonia often uses the catch phrase pick up line, "Naba-vibes ko..." (I sense vibes...).
 Diva Montelaba as Benita "Kimberly" Labastida
Franz dela Cruz's girlfriend whom he met in a cheap spa wherein she works as a masseuse offering "extra services".
 Tanya Gomez as Glenda
 Mark Marasigan as Perry
 Joshua Aragon as Jake Labastida
Nenita's irresponsible family.
 Mike Jovida as Henry
Lawyer friend of Philip".

Production and development
After the sudden cancellation of Haram which was shelved due to controversies and sensitivity issues involving Islamic faith, GMA Network management decide to come up for a new project making use of the same cast. Series' creator Suzette Doctolero with creative head, Jake Tordesillas and Entertainment TV head, Lilybeth Rasonable began conceptualizing the series under the title "Hiram na Sandali" (lit. Borrowed Moment) in early October 2012. Doctolero decided to pitch the series about "May–December affair" to GMA Entertainment TV Group, since she thought it would be the best replacement for Haram. The network's Drama Department found the concept interesting, since it is "unusual" for a local drama serial to discuss that kind of concept. The title was later changed to Pahiram ng Sandali.

The series has five main casts (fixed cast) being Lorna Tolentino, Dingdong Dantes, Christopher de Leon, Max Collins and Alessandra de Rossi; with eight prominent supporting characters. Tolentino was cast as Janice, a married woman who fell in love in a much younger guy – Alex which played by Dantes. Tolentino finds the series as a "masterpiece" and stated that she can’t let go of the script until she finish reading it till the last page. On the other hand, Dantes expounds, "Words will never be enough to articulate the beauty of Pahiram ng Sandali as an artwork". Teen actress, Kylie Padilla was originally cast as Cindy, but later backed out due to its "far too adult" contents for her age and would require her to do very sensitive scenes that will put her in conflict with her Muslim faith. Collins took over the place left by Padilla as Dantes' second leading lady.

The producer hires Maryo J. delos Reyes to helm the series. Delos Reyes stated that the material has become more intriguing compared to the shelved Haram, since it’s now a love triangle story between a mother, a daughter, and the man who comes between them. "Directing stories about relationships is my comfort zone," Delos Reyes added. He has done many films with some of the senior stars of the cast except for Dantes who he works for the first time for this series. Series’ production began in November 12, 2012 in Quezon City.

Reception

Ratings
According to AGB Nielsen Philippines' Mega Manila household television ratings, the pilot episode of Pahiram ng Sandali earned a 23.7% rating. While the final episode scored a 25.1% rating.

Critical response
Mario Bautista of Journal reviews: "Max (Collins) got praised particularly for that scene last Wednesday when she went to bed with Dingdong and he realizes that she's still a virgin. Director Maryo de los Reyes really handled that delicate scene quite well."

Accolades

References

External links
 

2012 Philippine television series debuts
2013 Philippine television series endings
Filipino-language television shows
GMA Network drama series
Television shows set in the Philippines